ARBH may refer to:
Adolescent Radioactive Blackbelt Hamsters
Arbh, a surname such as belonged to Finn mac Arbh, slain in the battle of Bealach Cro under the reign of Aedh Ailghin
Army of the Republic of Bosnia and Herzegovina, more commonly shortened as ARBiH